Gale is a crater, and probable dry lake, at  in the northwestern part of the Aeolis quadrangle on Mars. The crater was named after Walter Frederick Gale, an amateur astronomer from Sydney, Australia, who observed Mars in the late 19th century. Aeolis Palus is the plain between the northern wall of Gale and the northern foothills of Aeolis Mons. Peace Vallis, a nearby outflow channel, 'flows' down from the hills to the Aeolis Palus below and seems to have been carved by flowing water. Several lines of evidence suggest that a lake existed inside Gale shortly after the formation of the crater.

The NASA Mars rover Curiosity, of the Mars Science Laboratory (MSL) mission, landed in "Yellowknife" Quad 51 of Aeolis Palus in Gale at 05:32 UTC August 6, 2012. NASA named the landing location Bradbury Landing on August 22, 2012. Curiosity is exploring Aeolis Mons and surrounding areas.

Description

Gale, named for Walter F. Gale (1865–1945), an amateur astronomer from Australia, spans  in diameter and holds a mountain, Aeolis Mons (informally named "Mount Sharp" to pay tribute to geologist Robert P. Sharp) rising  from the crater floor, higher than Mount Rainier rises above Seattle. Gale is roughly the size of Connecticut and Rhode Island.

The crater formed when an asteroid or comet hit Mars in its early history, about 3.5 to 3.8 billion years ago. The impactor punched a hole in the terrain, and the subsequent explosion ejected rocks and soil that landed around the crater. Layering in the central mound (Aeolis Mons) suggests it is the surviving remnant of an extensive sequence of deposits.

At 10:32 p.m. PDT on August 5, 2012 (1:32 a.m.

Scientists chose Gale as the landing site for Curiosity because it has many signs that water was present over its history. The crater's geology is notable for containing both clays and sulfate minerals, which form in water under different conditions and may also preserve signs of past life. The history of water at Gale, as recorded in its rocks, is giving Curiosity many clues to study as it pieces together whether Mars ever could have been a habitat for microbes. Gale contains a number of fans and deltas that provide information about lake levels in the past, including: Pancake Delta, Western Delta, Farah Vallis delta and the  Peace Vallis Fan.

Geology
Orbital THEMIS and topography data, plus visible and near-infrared images, were used to make a geologic map of the crater.  CRISM data indicated the lower bench unit was composed of interstratified clay and sulfates.  Curiosity explored the stratigraphy of the crater consisting of the Bradbury Group and the overlying Mount Sharp Group.  Formations within the Bradbury Group include the Yellowknife and Kimberley, while the Murray Formation is at the base of the Mount Sharp Group.  The Bradbury Group consists of fluvial conglomerates, cross-bedded sandstones, and mudstones reflecting a basaltic provenance.  Sandstone clinoforms indicate deltaic deposits.  The Murray Formation is a laminated mudstone overlain by a cross-bedded or clinoform sandstone, though in places the base is a conglomerate.  Thus, the formation is interpreted to have been deposited in a lacustrine environment adjacent to a fluvial-deltaic one.  The Murray Formation is overlain by clay and sulfate-bearing strata.

The mound is composed of layered material and may have been laid down over a period of around 2 billion years. The origin of this mound is not known with certainty, but research suggests it is the eroded remnant of sedimentary layers that once filled the crater completely, possibly originally deposited on a lakebed. Evidence of fluvial activity was observed early on in the mission at the Shaler outcrop (first observed on Sol 120, investigated extensively between Sols 309-324). Observations made by the rover Curiosity at the Pahrump Hills strongly support the lake hypothesis: sedimentary facies including sub mm-scale horizontally-laminated mudstones, with interbedded fluvial crossbeds are representative of sediments which accumulate in lakes, or on the margins of lakes which grow and contract in response to lake-level. These lake-bed mudstones are referred to as the Murray Formation, and form a significant amount of the Mount Sharp group. The Siccar Point group (named after the famous unconformity at Siccar Point) overlies the Mount Sharp group, and the two units are separated by a major unconformity which dips toward the North. At present, the Stimson formation is the only stratigraphic unit within the Siccar Point group which has been investigated in-detail by Curiosity. The Stimson formation represents the preserved expression of a dry aeolian dune field, where sediment was transported towards the north, or northeast by palaeowinds within the crater. In the Emerson plateau area (from Marias Pass, to East Glacier), the outcrops are characterised predominantly by simple cross-sets, deposited by simple sinuous-crested dunes, with heights up to ~10 m. To the south, at the Murray buttes, the outcrop are characterised by compound cross-sets, with a hierarchy of bounding surfaces migration of small dunes superimposed on the lee-slope of a large dune known as a "draa". These draas have estimates heights of ~40 m, and migrated toward the north, while superimposed dunes migrated toward the east-northeast. Further to the south, at the Greenheugh pediment, compound and simple cross-sets consistent with aeolian depositional processes have been observed in the pediment capping unit. Observations made during the ascent of the Greenheugh pediment between Sols 2665-2734 demonstrated that the pediment capping unit has sedimentary textures, facies and architecture that are consistent with the rest of the Stimson formation. Furthermore, analysis of sedimentary facies and architecture provided evidence which indicates fluctuating wind directions, from a seasonal temporal scale - recorded by interstratified windripple and avalanche strata, through to millennial time scales recorded by reversal of the sediment transport direction. These wind reversals suggest variable and changeable atmospheric circulation during this time.

Observations of possible cross-bedded strata on the upper mound suggest aeolian processes, but the origin of the lower mound layers remains ambiguous.

In February 2019, NASA scientists reported that the Mars Curiosity rover had determined, for the first time, the density of Mount Sharp in Gale, thereby establishing a clearer understanding of how the mountain was formed.

Spacecraft exploration

Numerous channels eroded into the flanks of the crater's central mound could give access to the layers for study. Gale is the landing site of the Curiosity rover, delivered by the Mars Science Laboratory spacecraft, which was launched November 26, 2011 and landed on Mars inside the crater Gale on the plains of Aeolis Palus on August 6, 2012. Gale was previously a candidate landing site for the 2003 Mars Exploration Rover mission, and has been one of four prospective sites for ESA's ExoMars.

In December 2012, scientists working on the Mars Science Laboratory mission announced that an extensive soil analysis of Martian soil performed by Curiosity showed evidence of water molecules, sulphur and chlorine, as well as hints of organic compounds. However, terrestrial contamination, as the source of the organic compounds, could not be ruled out.

On September 26, 2013, NASA scientists reported that Curiosity detected "abundant, easily accessible" water (1.5 to 3 weight percent) in soil samples at the Rocknest region of Aeolis Palus in Gale. In addition, the rover found two principal soil types: a fine-grained mafic type and a locally derived, coarse-grained felsic type. The mafic type, similar to other martian soils and martian dust, was associated with hydration of the amorphous phases of the soil. Also, perchlorates, the presence of which may make detection of life-related organic molecules difficult, were found at the Curiosity landing site (and earlier at the more polar site of the Phoenix lander) suggesting a "global distribution of these salts". NASA also reported that Jake M rock, a rock encountered by Curiosity on the way to Glenelg, was a mugearite and very similar to terrestrial mugearite rocks.

On December 9, 2013, NASA reported that, based on evidence from Curiosity studying Aeolis Palus, Gale contained an ancient freshwater lake which could have been a hospitable environment for microbial life.

On December 16, 2014, NASA reported detecting, by the Curiosity rover at Gale, an unusual increase, then decrease, in the amounts of methane in the atmosphere of the planet Mars; in addition, organic chemicals were detected in powder drilled from a rock. Also, based on deuterium to hydrogen ratio studies, much of the water at Gale on Mars was found to have been lost during ancient times, before the lakebed in the crater was formed; afterwards, large amounts of water continued to be lost.

On October 8, 2015, NASA confirmed that lakes and streams existed in Gale 3.3 to 3.8 billion years ago delivering sediments to build up the lower layers of Mount Sharp.

On June 1, 2017, NASA reported that the Curiosity rover provided evidence of an ancient lake in Gale on Mars that could have been favorable for microbial life; the ancient lake was stratified, with shallows rich in oxidants and depths poor in oxidants; and, the ancient lake provided many different types of microbe-friendly environments at the same time. NASA further reported that the Curiosity rover will continue to explore higher and younger layers of Mount Sharp in order to determine how the lake environment in ancient times on Mars became the drier environment in more modern times.

On August 5, 2017, NASA celebrated the fifth anniversary of the Curiosity rover mission landing, and related exploratory accomplishments, on the planet Mars. (Videos: Curiosity First Five Years (02:07); Curiosity POV: Five Years Driving (05:49); Curiosity Discoveries About Gale Crater (02:54))

On June 7, 2018, NASA's Curiosity made two significant discoveries in Gale. Organic molecules preserved in 3.5 billion-year-old bedrock and seasonal variations in the level of methane in the atmosphere further support the theory that past conditions may have been conducive to life. It is possible that a form of water-rock chemistry might have generated the methane, but scientists cannot rule out the possibility of biological origins. Methane previously had been detected in Mars' atmosphere in large, unpredictable plumes. This new result shows that low levels of methane within Gale repeatedly peak in warm, summer months and drop in the winter every year. Organic carbon concentrations were discovered on the order of 10 parts per million or more. This is close to the amount observed in Martian meteorites and about 100 times greater than prior analysis of organic carbon on Mars' surface. Some of the molecules identified include thiophenes, benzene, toluene, and small carbon chains, such as propane or butene.

On November 4, 2018, geologists presented evidence, based on studies in Gale by the Curiosity rover, that there was plenty of water on early Mars. In January 2020, researchers have found certain minerals, made of carbon and oxygen, in rocks at Gale Crater, which may have formed in an ice-covered lake during a cold stage between warmer periods, or after Mars lost most of its atmosphere and became permanently cold.

Images

Surface images

Interactive Mars map

See also

References

External links

 Google Mars scrollable map - centered on Gale Crater
 Gale Crater - Curiosity rover "StreetView" (Sol 2 - 08/08/2012) - NASA/JPL - 360° panorama from 360pano.eu
 
 Gale Crater - Central Debris Mound from lpl.arizona.edu
 Gale Crater - Layers from lpl.arizona.edu
 Gale Crater - Image/THEMIS VIS 18m/px Mosaic from mars.asu.edu (Zoomable) (small)
 Gale Crater - Surroundings from HRSCview.fu-berlin.de
 Gale Crater - 3D version by ESA
 Video (04:32) - Evidence: Water "Vigorously" Flowed On Mars - September, 2012
 
 

 
Aeolis quadrangle
Impact craters on Mars
Mars Science Laboratory
Rocks on Mars
Water on Mars